Masarm-e Sofla (also Romanized as Māşarm-e Soflá, Māsaram-e Soflá, and Māsarm-e Soflá; also known as Māsaram, Māsaram-e Pā’īn, and Māsarm-e Pā’īn) is a village in Kuh Mareh Sorkhi Rural District, Arzhan District, Shiraz County, Fars Province, Iran. At the 2006 census, its population was 251, in 61 families.

References 

Populated places in Shiraz County